John Albert Dowd (1876–1932) was a farmer and political figure in Saskatchewan. He represented Kerrobert in the Legislative Assembly of Saskatchewan from 1917 to 1926 as a Liberal.

He was the son of Benjamin Dowd and was educated in South Durham, Ontario. In 1904, he married E.A. Millar. Dowd lived in Millerdale, Saskatchewan.

References 

Saskatchewan Liberal Party MLAs
1876 births
1932 deaths